Phlegra procera is a jumping spider species in the genus Phlegra that lives in Zimbabwe.

References

Salticidae
Endemic fauna of Zimbabwe
Arthropods of Zimbabwe
Spiders of Africa
Spiders described in 2008
Taxa named by Wanda Wesołowska